Mark Woodforde and Martina Navratilova were the defending champions but Navratilova did not compete. Woodforde competed with Meredith McGrath but lost in the quarterfinals to Byron Black and Pam Shriver.

Todd Woodbridge and Helena Suková defeated T. J. Middleton and Lori McNeil in the final, 3–6, 7–5, 6–3 to win the mixed doubles tennis title at the 1994 Wimbledon Championships. Woodbridge completed his career grand slam in Mixed Doubles.

Seeds

  Jonathan Stark /  Patty Fendick (second round)
  Byron Black /  Pam Shriver (semifinals)
  Cyril Suk /  Gigi Fernández (second round, withdrew)
  Todd Woodbridge /  Helena Suková (champions)
  Mark Woodforde /  Meredith McGrath (quarterfinals)
  Grant Connell /  Lindsay Davenport (semifinals)
  Andrei Olhovskiy /  Larisa Neiland (quarterfinals)
  Tom Nijssen /  Manon Bollegraf (first round)
  Rick Leach /  Lisa Raymond (third round)
  Patrick Galbraith /  Debbie Graham (first round)
  John Fitzgerald /  Elizabeth Smylie (quarterfinals)
  Piet Norval /  Caroline Vis (first round)
  Ken Flach /  Julie Richardson (third round, withdrew)
  David Adams /  Kristie Boogert (first round)
  Darren Cahill /  Rennae Stubbs (withdrew)
  Brad Pearce /  Kerry-Anne Guse (first round)

Draw

Finals

Top half

Section 1

Section 2

Bottom half

Section 3

Section 4

References

External links

1994 Wimbledon Championships on WTAtennis.com
1994 Wimbledon Championships – Doubles draws and results at the International Tennis Federation

X=Mixed Doubles
Wimbledon Championship by year – Mixed doubles
Wimbledon Championships